Live à Bercy is the second live album by Mylène Farmer, released on 21 May 1997. It was also produced as a video.

Background 

After the successful concerts tour of 1996, whose shows were spread out from 25 May to 15 December, a live album was recorded and produced by Thierry Suc, and sponsored by NRJ. It was remixed in studio to give it a better sound. The re-orchestrations, composed by Laurent Boutonnat, were very dynamic with very rock sonorities. The photos illustrating the booklet were realized by Claude Gassian. The track listing contains songs  from the four studio albums of Farmer, but Anamorphosée was sharply privileged, because all its songs were included on the album, except "Eaunanisme". This live album was released on 21 May 1997.

In May, a musical video of the concert was also realized, first as a VHS. For the first time, François Hans participated in the shooting of a live. As for the previous live album En concert, several scenes were re-filmed without the audience. The live video contains nevertheless numerous errors of editing, because it was compiled from four shows: three at Bercy and another in Geneva. It contains besides a making of and new images.

Two years later, in May 1999, the video was released as a DVD, which constituted moreover the first DVD of the singer. However, it doesn't contain the bonuses available on the cassette. The DVD was dedicated to the singer's brother, Jean-Loup Gautier, died on 26 October 1996 after a road accident.

Critical reception 

Generally well received by media, the album was nevertheless criticized for having been too much remixed in studio. For example, the journalist Caroline Bee declared: "Everything is emphasized: Mylène's voice, the shouts of the public, Abraham Laboriel's powerful drum, the bass and both guitars, impeccable. All that gives a perfect whole, without dissonance, but which sounds more as an album studio than as a real transcription of concert".

Commercial performance 

In France, the album debuted at number 3 on French Album Chart, on 24 May 1997. It then reached its peak position, #2, for two consecutive weeks, and for two other weeks two months later. Andrea Bocelli's Romanza, then Era's eponymous album made it unable to reach number one. It remained for 18 weeks in the top ten, and dropped until #36 on 8 November, but managed to re-entered the top 20 the week after and there stayed for nine weeks. It almost kept on dropping the months after and left the chart (Top 75) after its 44th week of attendance, on 28 March 1998. Three days before, the album achieved Double platinum status by the SNEP, the French certifier, for a minimum of 600,000 copies sold.

The video, both the VHS and the DVD, reached the first position on the French Videos Chart. They were both certified Diamond videos on 24 October 2001, for more than 100,000 sold copies.

In Belgium Wallonia, the album went straight to number 4 on 7 June 1997 and then peaked at #2 for 12 consecutive weeks (Era topped the chart then). After 18 weeks in the top ten, the album slowly dropped the four following months and disappeared from the chart (Top 50) on 31 March 1998, after 35 weeks of attendance.

Track listing

Album 
Disc one
 "Ouverture" (4:41)
 "Vertige" (6:24)
 "California" (7:12)
 "Que Mon Cœur Lâche" (4:42)
 "Et Tournoie..." (4:30)
 "Je T'aime Mélancolie" (5:14)
 "L'autre..." (5:46)
 "Libertine" (5:34)
 "L'instant X" (9:41)
 "Alice" (5:28)

Disc two
 "Comme J'ai Mal" (4:41)
 "Sans Contrefaçon" (4:22)
 "Mylène S'en Fout" (5:37)
 "Désenchantée" (7:26)
 "Rêver" (8:26)
 "Laisse Le Vent Emporter Tout" (6:29)
 "Tomber 7 Fois..." (5:05)
 "Ainsi Soit Je..." (4:39)
 "La Poupée Qui Fait Non" (duet with Khaled) (4:39)
 "XXL" (7:26)

Cassette 

A-side
 "Ouverture"
 "Vertige"
 "California"
 "Que mon cœur lâche"
 "Je t'aime mélancolie"
 "L'Autre"
 "Libertine"
 "L'Instant X"
 "Alice"

B-side
 "Comme j'ai mal"
 "Sans contrefaçon"
 "Mylène s'en fout"
 "Désenchantée"
 "Rêver"
 "Laisse le vent emporter tout"
 "Ainsi soit je..."
 "La Poupée qui fait non" (duet with Khaled)
 "XXL"

VHS/DVD 
Act I
 "Ouverture" (4:45)
 "Vertige" (6:20)
 "California" (7:30)
 "Que mon cœur lâche" (4:35)
 "Et Tournoie..." (4:30)
Act II
 "Je t'aime mélancolie" (5:20)
 "L'Autre..." (5:50)
Act III
 "Libertine" (5:40)
 "L'Instant X" (9:36)
Act IV
 "Alice" (5:25)
 "Comme j'ai mal" (4:35)
Act V
 "Sans contrefaçon" (4:20)
 "Mylène s'en fout" (4:45)
 "Désenchantée" (8:15)
Act VI
 "Rêver" (8:00)
 "Laisse le vent emporter tout" (6:25)
 "Tomber 7 fois..." (6:00)
 "Ainsi soit je..." (5:00)
 "La Poupée qui fait non" (duet with Khaled) (4:30)
Encore
 "XXL" (7:00)

Personnel 

 Laurent Boutonnat – arranger, producer
 Jermaine Brown – dancer
 Yvan Cassar – arranger, clavier, director, keyboards, musical director
 Bertrand Chatnet – mixing
 Jeff Dahlgren – guitar
 Christophe Danchaud – dancer
 Mylène Farmer – concept, primary artist, vocals
 Emmanuel Feyrabend – mixing, mixing assistant
 Claude Gassian – photography
 Khaled – performer
 Abe Laboriel Jr. - drums
 Henry Neu – design
 André Perriat – mastering
 Philippe Rault – consultant, producer
 Brian Ray – guitar
 Thierry Rogen – engineer
 Carole Rowley – choir/chorus
 Brian Thomas – dancer
 Paul Van Parys – executive producer
 Jerry Watts Jr. - bass
 Donna DeLory - Dancer/back vocalist

Charts

Weekly album charts

Weekly DVD charts

Year-end album charts

Year-end DVD charts

Certifications and sales 

!colspan=3|Album
|-

!colspan=3|VHS
|-

!colspan=3|DVD
|-

Formats 

Audio
 Double CD
 Double CD – Promo - "Spider" (2 CD + VHS)
 Cassette (Doesn't contain "Et Tournoie..." and "Tomber 7 fois...")

Video
 VHS
 Plastic case with hologram logos
 Plastic case with silvery logos
 12" Laserdisc
 DVD
 Plastic case with hologram logos
 Plastic case with silvery logos

References 

Mylène Farmer live albums
Mylène Farmer video albums
1997 live albums
1997 video albums
Live video albums
Polydor Records live albums
Polydor Records video albums